This is a list of notable current and former faculty members, administrators, alumni, and attendees of Cumberland University in Lebanon, Tennessee.

Notable alumni

Academia

University presidents 

 James S. Buchanan, 4th President of the University of Oklahoma, 1923-1925
 Fontaine Richard Earle, President of Cane Hill College; president of Arkansas Cumberland College (now the University of the Ozarks)
 Ira Landrith, President of Belmont College (now University), 1904-1912
 David E. Mitchell, 5th President of Cumberland University, 1902-1906
 Laban Lacy Rice, 14th President of Cumberland University, 1941–1946

Professors 

 Shigehide Arakawa, Professor at Imperial University, Japan
 John William Burgess, Founder and dean of Columbia University's School of Political Science, 1880-1912
 J. P. Carnahan, Professor of mathematics
 Hiei Fukunoka, Professor of law in Japan
 Richard M. Milburn, Professor of law at Indiana University
 George Abram Miller, Mathematics professor and early group theorist

Activists 

 Dan Jack Combs, Advocate for the legalization of marijuana
 Cody Fowler, Civil rights activist, lawyer
 Martin White Greeson, Businessman, activist for flood prevention
 Myles Horton, Civil rights activist, educator
 Josephine Pearson, Anti-suffragist activist
 Byron Sigcho-Lopez, Community activist

Art, education, literature, and humanities 

 John William Burgess, Author of influential works on political science
 Wendell Mayes, Playwright, screenwriter
 William O'Steele, Award-winning author
 Cale Young Rice, Playwright, poet
 Laban Lacy Rice, Writer
 William E. Ward, co-founder of Ward Seminary for Young Ladies (later Ward-Belmont College) in Nashville, Tennessee

Athletics 

 Dave Aaron, Head football coach at Austin Peay State College (now University), 1946–1954; Head basketball coach at Austin Peay State College (now University), 1946-1962
 George E. Allen, Head football coach of the 1916 Cumberland University team that lost 0–222 to Georgia Tech
 Marvin O. Bridges, Head football coach at the University of Florida at Lake City, a predecessor institution to the University of Florida
 Byrd Douglas, Cumberland University athletic director and football and baseball coach, 1922; author of The Science of Baseball (1922)
 A.J. Harmon, Professional football player for the Columbus Lions
 Rebecca Holloway, Professional soccer player
 Daniel Jackson, Professional soccer player
 Maylee Atthin-Johnson, Captain of the Trinidad and Tobago women's national soccer team, 2008
 Jack Farmer, Second baseman for the Pittsburgh Pirates, 1916, and the Cleveland Indians, 1918
 Luis Martinez, Catcher for the San Diego Padres, 2011, and Texas Rangers, 2012
 Ryan Sullivan, Professional cyclist
 Walt Wells, Head football coach at Eastern Kentucky University, 2020–present
 Craig Wight, Professional soccer player and manager
 Aaron Wilkerson, Pitcher for the Milwaukee Brewers, 2017-2019

Business and economics 

 James L. Bomar Jr., President, Rotary International, 1979–1980
John Edgerton, President, National Association of Manufacturers, 1921-1931
Enoch Ensley, Railroad president, banker, economist
Thomas W. Ford, President, Sour Lake Chemical Company
 William H. Hardy, Founder of three Mississippi cities: Gulfport, Hattiesburg, and Laurel
 Francis Ikome, Founder and president, Cameroonian American Chamber of Commerce (CAMAM)
 Oscar Goodbar Johnston, President, Delta & Pine Land Company of Mississippi
 Edward Labry III, Executive chairman, Dama Financial
 Trent McCracken, Former president, Spectrum Inc.; former president and CEO, Emerge Health Solutions
 T. Boone Pickens Sr., Oilman, lawyer, and father of T. Boone Pickens Jr.

Entertainment 

 Chloe Kohanski, Singer-songwriter
 Wendell Mayes, Oscar-nominated screenwriter
 Jordan Taylor, Co-creator of Blimey Cow

Government and politics

U.S. Cabinet members 

 Cordell Hull, Secretary of State under President Franklin Delano Roosevelt, 1933–1944

U.S. diplomats 

 Edward Albright, U. S. Envoy Extraordinary and Minister Plenipotentiary to Finland, 1933–1937; U.S. Envoy Extraordinary and Minister Plenipotentiary to Costa Rica, 1937
 Sam P. Gilstrap, Consul in Hong Kong and Macau, 1961; Ambassador Extraordinary and Plenipotentiary to Malawi, 1964-1965
 James D. Porter, United States Minister to Chile, 1893-1894
 James D. Tillman, U.S. Minister to Ecuador, 1895-1897

U.S. governors 

 James V. Allred, 33rd Governor of Texas, 1935-1939
 William B. Bate, 23rd Governor of Tennessee, 1883-1887
 James T. Blair Jr., 44th Governor of Missouri, 1957-1961
Gordon Weaver Browning, 38th Governor of Tennessee, 1937-1939 and 1949-1953
Sidney Johnston Catts, 22nd Governor of Florida, 1917-1921
 Frank G. Clement, 41st Governor of Tennessee, 1954–1959 and 1963–1967
 LeRoy Collins, 33rd Governor of Florida, 1955-1961
 Jeff Davis, 20th Governor of Arkansas, 1901-1907
 Edward H. East, Acting Governor of Tennessee, 1865
Murphy J. Foster, 31st Governor of Louisiana, 1892-1900
 William J. Holloway, 8th Governor of Oklahoma, 1929-1931
 James B. McCreary, 27th and 37th Governor of Kentucky, 1875-1879 and 1911-1915
 James D. Porter, 20th Governor of Tennessee, 1875-1879
 Park Trammell, 21st Governor of Florida, 1913-1917

U.S. lieutenant governors 

 Hugh C. Anderson, Lieutenant Governor of Tennessee, 1915
 James T. Blair Jr., 35th Lieutenant Governor of Missouri, 1949-1957
 James L. Bomar Jr., Lieutenant Governor of Tennessee, 1963–65
 Sam Lumpkin, Lieutenant Governor of Mississippi, 1948-1952
 Milton H. Mabry, 8th Lieutenant Governor of Florida, 1885-1889

Members of the U.S. Senate 

 Joseph W. Bailey Sr., U.S. Senator from Texas, 1891-1913
 William B. Bate, U.S. Senator from Tennessee, 1887-1905
 Jeff Davis, U.S. Senator from Arkansas, 1907-1913
Murphy J. Foster, U.S. Senator from Louisiana, 1901-1913
 Thomas P. Gore, U.S. Senator from Oklahoma, 1907–1921 and 1931–1937
Carl Hatch, U.S. Senator from New Mexico, 1933-1949
Cordell Hull, U.S. Senator from Tennessee, 1931-1933
Howell Edmunds Jackson, U.S. Senator from Tennessee, 1881-1886
William F. Kirby, U.S. Senator from Arkansas, 1916-1921
Joshua B. Lee, U.S. Senator from Oklahoma, 1937-1943
 James B. McCreary, U.S. Senator from Kentucky, 1903-1909
 Bert H. Miller, U.S. Senator from Idaho, 1949
Tom Stewart, U.S. Senator from Tennessee, 1938-1949
Park Trammell, U.S. Senator from Florida, 1917-1936

Members of the U.S. House of Representatives 
 Thomas G. Abernethy, U.S. Representative from Mississippi, 1943–1973
 Joseph H. Acklen, U.S. Representative from Louisiana, 1878-1881
Clifford Allen, U.S. Representative from Tennessee, 1975-1978
John Mills Allen, U.S. Representative from Mississippi, 1885-1901
 Orland K. Armstrong, U.S. Representative from Missouri, 1951-1953
Richard Merrill Atkinson, U.S. Representative from Tennessee, 1937-1939
Risden Tyler Bennett, U.S. Representative from Tennessee, 1883-1887
 Maecenas Eason Benton, U.S. Representative from Missouri, 1897–1905; also father of famous painter, Thomas Hart Benton
Eugene Black, U.S. Representative from Texas, 1915-1929
Stratton Bone Jr., U.S. Representative from Tennessee, 1997-2010
Foster V. Brown, U.S. Representative from Tennessee, 1895-1897
 Joseph Edgar Brown, U.S. Representative from Tennessee, 1921-1923
Gordon Weaver Browning, U.S. Representative from Tennessee, 1923-1935
 Omar Truman Burleson, U.S. Representative from Texas, 1947-1978
 Mounce Gore Butler, U.S. Representative from Tennessee, 1905-1907
Robert R. Butler, U.S. Representative from Oregon, 1928-1933
Adam M. Byrd, U.S. Representative from Mississippi, 1903-1911
Robert Porter Caldwell, U.S. Representative from Tennessee, 1871-1873
William Parker Caldwell, U.S. Representative from Tennessee, 1875-1879
Samuel Caruthers, U.S. Representative from Missouri, 1853-1859
Frank Chelf, U.S. Representative from Kentucky, 1945-1967
Judson C. Clements, U.S. Representative from Georgia, 1881-1891
 Wynne F. Clouse, U.S. Representative from Tennessee, 1921-1923
 Jere Cooper, U.S. Representative from Tennessee, 1929-1957
 Nicholas N. Cox, U.S. Representative from Tennessee, 1891-1901
 William E. Cox, U.S. Representative from Indiana, 1907–1919.
 William Ruffin Cox, U.S. Representative from North Carolina, 1881-1887
 William Benjamin Craig, U.S. Representative from Alabama, 1907-1911
 Reese C. De Graffenreid, U.S. Representative from Texas, 1897-1902
 Dudley M. DuBose, U.S. Representative from Georgia, 1871-1873
 John Duncan Sr., U.S. Representative from Tennessee, 1965-1988
 Harold Earthman, U.S. Representative from Tennessee, 1945-1947
 Benjamin A. Enloe, U.S. Representative from Tennessee, 1887-1895
 Joe L. Evins, U.S. Representative from Tennessee, 1947-1977
 Lewis P. Featherstone, U.S. Representative from Arkansas, 1890-1891
 Antonio M. Fernández, U.S. Representative from New Mexico, 1943-1956
 Morgan Cassius Fitzpatrick, U.S. Representative from Tennessee, 1903-1905
 Aaron L. Ford, U.S. Representative from Mississippi, 1935–1943
 Lucien C. Gause, U.S. Representative from Arkansas, 1875-1879
 Brady P. Gentry, U.S. Representative from Texas, 1953–1957
 Edward Isaac Golladay, U.S. Representative from Tennessee, 1871-1873
 Isaac Herschel Goodnight, U.S. Representative from Kentucky, 1889-1895
 George Washington Gordon, U.S. Representative from Tennessee, 1907-1911
 Wharton J. Green, U.S. Representative from North Carolina, 1883-1887
 William Voris Gregory, U.S. Representative from Kentucky, 1927-1936
 John Edward Halsell, U.S. Representative from Kentucky, 1883-1887
 Oren Harris, U.S. Representative from Arkansas, 1953–1966; U.S. district judge
 Robert H. Hatton, U.S. Representative from Tennessee, 1859-1861
 Goldsmith W. Hewitt, U.S. Representative from Alabama, 1875–1879, 1881-1885
 Wilson S. Hill, U.S. Representative from Mississippi, 1903-1909
 John Ford House, U.S. Representative from Tennessee, 1875-1883
 George Huddleston, U.S. Representative from Alabama, 1915–1937
Cordell Hull, U.S. Representative from Tennessee, 1907–1921, 1923-1931
Luther Alexander Johnson, U.S. Representative from Texas, 1923-1946
Abraham Kazen Jr., U.S. Representative from Texas, 1967-1985
 Wade H. Kitchens, J.D., U.S. Representative from Arkansas, 1937-1941
 John C. Kyle, U. S. Representative from Mississippi, 1891-1897
 William Bailey Lamar, U.S. Representative from Florida, 1903-1909
Joshua B. Lee, U. S. Representative from Oklahoma, 1935-1937
 Joseph Carlton Loser, U.S. Representative from Tennessee, 1957-1963
 James B. McCreary, U.S. Representative from Kentucky, 1885-1897
 Samuel Davis McReynolds, U.S. Representative from Tennessee, 1923-1939
 John Ridley Mitchell, U.S. Representative from Tennessee, 1931-1939
 Morgan M. Moulder, U.S. Representative from Missouri, 1948–1962
 Henry Lowndes Muldrow, U. S. Representative from Mississippi, 1877-1885
 Tom J. Murray, U.S. Representative from Tennessee, 1943-1966
 David Alexander Nunn, U.S. Representative from Tennessee, 1867–1869, 1873-1875
 William Allan Oldfield, U.S. Representative from Arkansas, 1909-1928
 Wright Patman, U.S. Representative from Texas, 1929–1976
 Herron C. Pearson, U.S. Representative from Tennessee, 1935-1943
 Andrew Price, U.S. Representative from Louisiana, 1889-1897
 B. Carroll Reece, U.S. Representative from Tennessee, 1921–1931, 1933–1947, 1951-1961
 Haywood Yancey Riddle, U.S. Representative from Tennessee, 1875-1879
 James Edward Ruffin, U.S. Representative from Missouri, 1933-1935
 William Charles Salmon, U.S. Representative from Tennessee, 1923-1925
 Lon A. Scott, U.S. Representative from Tennessee, 1921-1923
 Thetus W. Sims, U.S. Representative from Tennessee, 1897-1921
 Thomas U. Sisson, U.S. Representative from Mississippi, 1909-1923
 William Ferguson Slemons, U.S. Representative from Arkansas, 1875-1881
 John H. Smithwick, U.S. Representative from Florida, 1919-1927
 Henry C. Snodgrass, U.S. Representative from Tennessee, 1891-1895
 John Hall Stephens, U.S. Representative from Texas, 1897-1917
 James Patrick Sutton, U.S. Representative from Tennessee, 1949-1955
 Fletcher B. Swank, U.S. Representative from Oklahoma, 1921-1929
 Charles Swindall, U.S. Representative from Oklahoma, 1920-1921
 Anthony F. Tauriello, U.S. Representative from New York, 1949-1951
 John May Taylor, U.S. Representative from Tennessee, 1883-1887
 J. Will Taylor, U.S. Representative from Tennessee, 1919-1939
 Zachary Taylor, U.S. Representative from Tennessee, 1885-1887
 William Wirt Vaughan, U.S. Representative from Tennessee, 1871-1873
 William W. Venable, U.S. Representative from Mississippi, 1916-1921
 Richard Warner, U.S. Representative from Tennessee, 1881-1885
 John T. Watkins, U.S. Representative from Louisiana, 1905–1921
 Charles K. Wheeler, U.S. Representative from Kentucky, 1897-1903
 Daniel B. Wright,  U.S. Representative from Mississippi, 1853-1857

U.S. territorial delegates 

 John Wilkins Whitfield, Territorial delegate to the U.S. Congress representing the Kansas Territory, 1854-1856

U.S. judicial officials

U.S. Supreme Court justices 

 Howell Edmunds Jackson, Associate Justice of the U.S. Supreme Court, 1893–1895
 Horace Harmon Lurton, Associate Justice of the U.S. Supreme Court, 1910–1914

Other federal judges 

 Campbell E. Beaumont, Judge of the U.S. District Court for the Southern District of California, 1939-1954
 Benjamin Franklin Cameron, Judge of the U.S. Court of Appeals for the Fifth Circuit, 1955-1964
 Sidney Lee Christie, Judge of the U.S. District Court for the Southern District of West Virginia and the U.S. District Court for the Northern District of West Virginia, 1964-1974
 Harry E. Claiborne, Chief Judge of the U.S. District Court for the District of Nevada, 1980-1986
Charles Dickens Clark, Judge of the U. S. District Court for the Eastern District of Tennessee and the U. S. District Court for the Middle District of Tennessee, 1895-1908
Leslie Rogers Darr, Judge of the U. S. District Court for the Middle District of Tennessee, 1939–1940; Judge of the U. S. District Court for the Eastern District of Tennessee, 1939-1967
Frederick Alvin Daugherty, Judge of the U.S. District Court for the Eastern District of Oklahoma, the U.S. District Court for the Northern District of Oklahoma, and the U.S. District Court for the Western District of Oklahoma, 1961-2006
Frank Gray Jr., Judge of the U.S. District Court for the Middle District of Tennessee, 1961-1978
William Voris Gregory, U.S. Attorney for the Western District of Kentucky, 1919-1923
Eli Shelby Hammond, Judge of the U.S. District Court for the Western District of Tennessee, 1878-1904
Carl Hatch, Judge of the U.S. District Court for the District of New Mexico, 1949-1963
Xenophon Hicks, Judge of the U. S. District Court for the Middle District of Tennessee, 1923–1928; Judge of the U. S. District Court for the Eastern District of Tennessee, 1923–1928; Circuit Judge of the U. S. Court of Appeals for the Sixth Circuit, 1928-1952
Tillman Davis Johnson, Judge of the U. S. District Court for the District of Utah, 1915-1953
Charles Gelbert Neese, Judge of the U.S. District Court for the Eastern District of Tennessee, 1961-1989
Thomas Wesley (Jack) Overall, Judge of the U.S. District Court for the Eastern District of Tennessee, 1970-1985
Harry Phillips, Circuit Judge of the U.S. Court of Appeals for the Sixth Circuit, 1963-1985
 John William Ross, Judge of the U. S. District Court for the Western District of Tennessee, 1921-1925
 Roy Mahlon Shelbourne, Judge of the U.S. District Court for the Western District of Kentucky, 1946-1974
David Davie Shelby, Judge of the U.S. Circuit Courts for the Fifth Circuit, 1899–1911; Circuit Judge of the United States Court of Appeals for the Fifth Circuit, 1899-1914
John A. Tyson, Justice of the United States Tax Court, 1935-1950
DuVal West, Judge of the U.S. District Court for the Western District of Texas, 1916-1949

State judges 
Bennett Douglas Bell, Justice of the Supreme Court of Tennessee, 1908-1910
Theodore M. Brantley, Chief Justice of the Supreme Court of Montana, 1899–1922
Burrill B. Battle, Justice of the Supreme Court of Arkansas, 1885-1910
William Dwight Beard, Justice of the Supreme Court of Tennessee, 1890-1910 (Chief Justice, 1902–1910)
Thomas Fletcher Bell, Justice of the First District Court of Louisiana, 1903-1912
Waller C. Caldwell, Associate Justice of the Supreme Court of Tennessee, 1886-1902
Chester C. Chattin, Justice of the Supreme Court of Tennessee, 1965-1974
James Waddey Clark, Justice of the Supreme Court of Oklahoma, 1925-1933
Sterling Robertson Cockrill, Chief Justice of the Supreme Court of Arkansas, 1884-1893
Dan Jack Combs, Justice of the Supreme Court of Kentucky, 1989-1993
Ross W. Dyer, Justice of the Supreme Court of Tennessee, 1961-1974 (Chief Justice, 1969–1974)
Reuben R. Gaines, Justice of the Supreme Court of Texas, 1886-1911 (Chief Justice, 1894–1911)
Charles Galbreath, Justice of the Tennessee Court of Appeals, 1968-1978
Grafton Green, Justice of the Supreme Court of Tennessee, 1910-1947 (Chief Justice, 1923–1947)
Dana Harmon, Justice of the 1st Circuit Court of Tennessee
Carleton Harris, Justice of the Supreme Court of Arkansas, 1957-1980
Fred L. Henley, Justice of the Supreme Court of Missouri, 1964-1978
Joe W. Henry, Chief Justice of the Supreme Court of Tennessee, 1979-1980
Joseph Morrison Hill, Chief Justice of the Supreme Court of Arkansas, 1904-1909
James Edwin Horton, Jr., Circuit Judge of the Eighth Circuit Court in Alabama. Presided over the retrial of Haywood Patterson, one of the Scottsboro Boys
Allison B. Humphreys, Justice of the Supreme Court of Tennessee, 1967-1974
James Douglas "Justice Jim" Johnson, Justice of the Supreme Court of Arkansas, 1958-1965
Napoleon B. Johnson, Justice of the Supreme Court of Oklahoma, 1948-1965
Roy Noble Lee, Chief Justice of the Supreme Court of Mississippi, 1987-1993
Benjamin Horsley Littleton, Judge of the United States Court of Claims, 1929-1966
Robert Martin Lusk, Justice of the Superior Court of Texas, 1888-1889
Milton H. Mabry, Justice of the Supreme Court of Florida, 1891-1903
Thomas Nicholas McClellan, Justice of the Supreme Court of Alabama, 1889-1906 (Chief Justice, 1898–1906)
A.B. Neil, Justice of the Supreme Court of Tennessee, 1942-1960
Matthew M. Neil, Justice of the Supreme Court of Tennessee, 1902-1918 (Chief Justice, 1913–1918)
Horace Elmo Nichols, Chief Justice of the Supreme Court of Georgia, 1975-1980
Charles H. O'Brien, Justice of the Supreme Court of Tennessee, 1987-1994
William Y. Pemberton, Chief Justice of the Supreme Court of Montana, 1893-1899
Paine Page Prim, 6th Chief Justice of the Supreme Court of Oregon, 1864–1866, 1870–1872, 1876-1878
Robert M. Rainey, Justice of the Supreme Court of Oklahoma, 1917-1921
Henry A. Sharpe, Justice of the Supreme Court of Alabama, 1898-1904
Griffin Smith Sr., Chief Justice of the Supreme Court of Arkansas, 1937-1955
Henderson M. Somerville, Member of the Board of General Appraisers, 1890-1915 (President, 1910–1914)
Charles Swindall, Justice of the Supreme Court of Oklahoma, 1929-1934
William Glenn Terrell, Justice of the Supreme Court of Florida, 1923-1964
Collin S. Tarpley, Justice of the Supreme Court of Mississippi, 1851
Leroy B. Valliant, Justice of the Supreme Court of Missouri, 1899-1912
Weldon B. White, Justice of the Supreme Court of Tennessee, 1961-1967
Samuel Franklin Wilson, Justice of the Tennessee Court of Chancery Appeals, 1895-1901
William Yerger, Justice of the Supreme Court of Mississippi, 1851-1853

State legislators 

 A.M. Aikin Jr., Member of the Texas state legislature, 1933-1979
 Tommy Burnett,  Majority Leader of the Tennessee House of Representatives
 Scotty Campbell, Member of the Tennessee General Assembly, 2010–2012, 2020–present
 Stuart B. Carter, Member of the Virginia General Assembly, 1950-1960
 Glenn Freeman, Member of the Kentucky General Assembly, 1970–1971, 1974–1977, 1996-2000
 Absolom Gant Jr., Member of the Texas state legislature, 1871-1873
 Tommy Head, Member of the Tennessee General Assembly, 1986–2004; brother of coach Pat Summitt
 J.F. Henley, Member of the Arkansas General Assembly, 1891–1895, 1901-1903
 Edmund B. Jenks, Member of the New York State Assembly, 1917-1932
 James Sloan Kuykendall, Member of the West Virginia House of Delegates, 1907–1908, 1919-1920
 A.K. Montgomery, Member of the New Mexico state legislature, 1937-1941
 John Alton Phillips, Member of the Mississippi House of Representatives, 1944-1965
 Mark Pody, Member of the Tennessee General Assembly, 2011–present
 E. Ray Reed, Member of the West Virginia state legislature, 1932–1936, 1940–1944, 1950-1954
 Charles Gilman Rolfe, Member of the Louisiana state legislature
 Edgar Bright Wilson, Speaker of the Tennessee House of Representatives, 1901-1903

Mayors 

 Hugh C. Anderson, Mayor of Jackson, Tennessee, 1884-1900
 Charles Rick Bell, Mayor of Lebanon, Tennessee, 2020–present
 Beverly Briley, 1st Mayor of Metropolitan Nashville, 1963-1975
 John Jay Good, 18th Mayor of Dallas, Texas, 1880-1881
 George Blackmore Guild, Mayor of Nashville, Tennessee, 1891-1895
 Henry D. Lindsley, 32nd Mayor of Dallas, Texas 1915-1917
 Milton H. Mabry, Mayor of Tupelo, Mississippi
 George B. Ward, 16th Mayor of Birmingham, Alabama, 1905-1908
Ben West, Mayor of Nashville, Tennessee, 1951–1963
Henry Buchanon Whitfield, Mayor of Columbus, Mississippi, 1872-unknown

Other 

 George E. Allen, Advisor to President Harry Truman
 Emory Fisk Best, Chief law clerk of the U.S. Department of the Interior
 Ambrose B. Broadbent, Speaker of the Tennessee Senate, 1931–33; Tennessee secretary of state, 1937-1941
J. P. Carnahan, Populist Party gubernatorial candidate in Arkansas, 1892
Judson C. Clements, Member of the Interstate Commerce Commission, 1892-1917 (chairman, 1910–1912)
Charles C. Crowe, Territorial secretary of Utah, 1870
Read Fletcher, U.S. Attorney for the Eastern District of Arkansas, 1856-1857
Stephen F. Hale, Deputy from Alabama to the Provisional Congress of the Confederate States, 1861–1862
John Ford House, Member of the Provisional Congress of the Confederacy from Tennessee
Sam Houston Johnson, Aide to his older brother, U.S. president Lyndon B. Johnson
Ira Landrith, Vice-presidential nominee for the Prohibition Party, 1916
Crawford Martin, 44th Attorney General of Texas, 1967-1972
Richard M. Milburn, 21st Attorney General of Indiana, January 1915-November 1915
Albert Patterson, Nominee for Attorney General of Alabama, 1954; assassinated for anti-corruption campaign
Joseph Turner Patterson, 34th Attorney General of Mississippi, 1956-1969
James D. Porter, U.S. Assistant Secretary of State, 1885-1887

Journalism 

 Justin B. Bradford, Founder/host of Penalty Box Radio
 Nat Caldwell, Pulitzer Prize-winning journalist at the Nashville Tennessean, 1934-1985
Daniel M. Grissom, St. Louis, Missouri, journalist
Abb Landis, Owner of the Nashville Banner, 1884-1885

Medicine 

 Thomas P. Howell, Doctor of Choctaw heritage who practiced in the Chickasaw Nation

Military 

 Alexander William Campbell, Confederate States general
 John C. Carter, Confederate States general
 William Ruffin Cox, Confederate States general
 Dudley M. DuBose, Confederate States general
 George Washington Gordon, Confederate States general
 Robert H. Hatton, Confederate States general
 George Doherty Johnston, Confederate States general; superintendent of The Citadel (military college)
 David R. Ray, Medal of Honor recipient, Vietnam War
 Edward Charles Tonsmeire, Legal officer on the staff of Rear Admiral Louis W. Perkins, commander of the 14th Coast Guard District in World War II
 Francis Eugene Whitfield, Confederate States general
 Cadmus M. Wilcox, Confederate States general

Other 

 Rosa Gerhardt, President of the Mobile Bar Association, 1948
 Napoleon B. Johnson, 1st President of the National Congress of American Indians, 1944-1952
 Graynella Packer, the first female radiotelegraph (wireless) operator to make overnight voyages on an ocean-going vessel

References

Cumberland University alumni